The Indian village Kulai is located in the taluk of Ambassa, district of Dhalai, in the State of Tripura.

Location 
 Kulai is located 19 km towards west from District headquarters Ambassa and 66 km from State capital Agartala
 Khowai, Kailasahar, Jogendranagar, Indranagar are nearby cities to Kulai
 Kanchanpur (2 km), Purba Nalicherra (2 km), Lalchhari (3 km), Paschim Lalchari (3 km), Jagannathpur (5 km) are nearby villages to Kulai
 Kulai is surrounded by Salema Tehsil towards North, Mungiakami Tehsil towards West, Manu Tehsil towards East, Tulashikhar Tehsil towards North
 Kulai is in the border of the Dhalai District and West Tripura District

Language 
Bengali is the local language in Kulai.

Institutions 
 Kulai Class XII School

Dhalai district